The European Jewish Center is a Jewish cultural center and synagogue located at place de Jérusalem, in the 17th arrondissement of Paris. The project was conceived by Joël Mergui, president of the Israelite Central Consistory of France. Construction began in 2015 and the building was inaugurated on 29 October 2019 in the presence of French President Emmanuel Macron.

Location 
Place de Jérusalem is at the corner of rue de Courcelles and boulevard de Reims in the 17th arrondissement of Paris.

The Center 
The center is about 5000 square metres and has two major parts:

 The Edmond J.Safra Synagogue, a synagogue with 600 seats, of which 200 seats for women in the mezzanine.
 Two buildings of five and seven floors respectively: Offices and a 2500 square metre cultural center with performance and exhibition halls

The project cost 15 million Euro before taxes (3 million supported by public funds, State and region, 5 million from foundations, 3 million patrons and private donors, the rest financed by loans). The City of Paris provided a 1650 square meter land parcel to the Consistory for the project.

Public transportation 
The closest Métro station to the building is at Porte de Champerret.

See also 

 Israelite Central Consistory of France
 History of the Jews in France
 Jews and Judaism in Europe

References

External links 

 

October 2019 events
Buildings and structures completed in 2019
17th arrondissement of Paris
Entertainment venues in Paris
Synagogues in Paris
Jewish culture
21st-century architecture in France